Sar Asiab-e Ajam (also Romanized as Sar Āsīāb-e Ājam; also known as Sar Āsīāb, Sar Asiyab, Sar Āsyāb, and Tang-e Sar Āsīāb) is a village in Ajam Rural District, Dishmok District, Kohgiluyeh County, Kohgiluyeh and Boyer-Ahmad Province, Iran. At the 2006 census, its population was 33, in 6 families.

References 

Populated places in Kohgiluyeh County